Lassila is a Finnish surname. Notable people with the surname include:

Carolus Lassila, Finnish diplomat
Kalle Lassila, Finnish cross country skier
Lydia Lassila, Australian freestyle skier
Ora Lassila, Finnish computer scientist
Teemu Lassila, Finnish ice hockey player
Väinö Lassila, Finnish physician, anatomist, anthropologist and human rights activist
Algot Untola (pen name Maiju Lassila), Finnish writer and journalist

Finnish-language surnames